Staff is both a surname and a nickname. Notable people with the name include:

Surname
 Barbara Staff (born 1924), American political activist
 David Staff (born 1979), English footballer
 Frank Staff (1918–1971), South African ballet dancer, choreographer, producer and company director
 Hanne Staff (born 1972), Norwegian orienteering athlete
 Jamie Staff (born 1973), English BMX and track racing cyclist and coach
 Kathy Staff (1928–2008), English actress who portrayed Nora Batty in Last of the Summer Wine
 Leopold Staff (1878–1957), Polish poet
 Mark Staff Brandl (born 1955), artist and art historian
 Ole Johannesen Staff (born 1789), Norwegian politician
 Ray Staff, mastering engineer for Led Zeppelin, The Rolling Stones, The Clash and Black Sabbath

Nickname
 Staff Barootes (1918–2000), Canadian physician and politician
 Staff Jones (born 1959), Welsh former rugby union player

Lists of people by nickname
Norwegian-language surnames